Players and pairs who neither have high enough rankings nor receive wild cards may participate in a qualifying tournament held one week before the annual Wimbledon Tennis Championships.

Seeds

  Kristin Godridge /  Kirrily Sharpe (qualified)
  Joannette Kruger /  Petra Schwarz-Ritter (qualifying competition, lucky losers)
  Ei Iida /  Miho Saeki (second round)
  Erika deLone /  Nicole Pratt (qualifying competition)

Qualifiers

  Kristin Godridge /  Kirrily Sharpe
  Yvette Basting /  Petra Kamstra

Lucky losers
  Joannette Kruger /  Petra Schwarz-Ritter

Qualifying draw

First qualifier

Second qualifier

External links

1995 Wimbledon Championships – Women's draws and results at the International Tennis Federation

Women's Doubles Qualifying
Wimbledon Championship by year – Women's doubles qualifying
Wimbledon Championships